The Accrediting Association of Seventh-day Adventist Schools (AAA) is an educational accreditation body operated by the General Conference of Seventh-day Adventists. 

Accreditation by the body is not academic accreditation and it is not recognized by government-recognized accreditors. Rather, accreditation by the AAA is based on whether an institution follows the religious tenets of the Seventh-day Adventist Church. This is official recognition by the Seventh-day Adventist church and is used to determine whether schools may apply for church funding. Its process support services, religious course material and the makeup of the teaching staff.

The Adventist Church is affiliated with or operates 7,598 schools, colleges and universities worldwide.  It says it operates "one of the largest church-supported educational systems in the world".

In terms of enrolled students, the Northern Caribbean University, located in Mandeville, Jamaica, is the largest Seventh-day Adventist university in the world.

See also

List of Seventh-day Adventist colleges and universities
List of Seventh-day Adventist secondary schools
 Seventh-day Adventist education

References

Further reading
 Alita Byrd, "The Changing Landscape of Adventist Higher Education in North America". Spectrum 37 (Spring 2009), p37–50

External links
 http://education.gc.adventist.org/ - Department of Education, General Conference of Seventh-day Adventists, Official Website
 Seventh-day Adventists: the Heritage Continues
 Adventist History by Michael W. Campbell is a blog about on-going research in Adventist Studies.

 
General Conference of Seventh-day Adventists
School accreditors